Ceryx hilda is a moth of the subfamily Arctiinae. It was described by George A. Ehrmann in 1894. It is found in Cameroon, Liberia and Tanzania.

References

Ceryx (moth)
Moths described in 1894
Moths of Africa